Gus's World Famous Fried Chicken is a popular fried chicken restaurant based in downtown Memphis, Tennessee. It was founded in the tiny town of Mason, Tennessee. It has been featured on Food Channel television shows including The Best Thing I Ever Ate, $40 a Day with Rachael Ray and Man v. Food. As of March 2020, there are 30 locations in 14 states across the United States. The business is known for the hearse out front advertising "chicken worth dying for". A red rooster also frequented the business.

Locations 

 Birmingham, AL
 Mesa, AZ
 Phoenix, AZ
 Little Rock, AR - Downtown
 Burbank, CA
 Long Beach, CA
 Los Angeles, CA
 Oakland, CA
 Santa Ana, CA
 Atlanta, GA
 Chamblee, GA
 Kennesaw, GA
 Sandy Springs, GA
 Chicago, IL - Fulton Market
 Chicago, IL - State Street
 Kansas City, KS
 Overland Park, KS
 Lexington, KY
 Metairie, LA
 New Orleans, LA
 Detroit, MI
 Royal Oak, MI
 Westland, MI
 Southaven, MS
 St. Louis, MO - Maplewood
 Bartlett, TN
 Germantown, TN
 East Memphis, TN - Mendenhall
 Knoxville, TN
 Mason, TN (Original Location)
 Memphis, TN - Downtown
 Austin, TX
 Dallas, TX
 Fort Worth, TX
 Houston, TX
 San Antonio, TX

See also
 List of chicken restaurants

References

External links
 

Restaurants in Tennessee
Buildings and structures in Memphis, Tennessee
Poultry restaurants
Chicken chains of the United States